The 1986 season was the New York Giants' 62nd in the National Football League (NFL) and their fourth under head coach Bill Parcells. The New York Giants, who play in the National Football Conference (NFC) of the National Football League (NFL), won their fifth championship—and first Super Bowl—in franchise history during the season. Led by consensus league Most Valuable Player (MVP) linebacker Lawrence Taylor and Super Bowl MVP quarterback Phil Simms, the Giants posted a 14–2 record during the regular season, tied for the best record in the league with the defending Super Bowl champion Chicago Bears and the best in team history. The Giants improved on their 10–6 record from 1985, won their first division championship since the NFL-AFL merger in 1970, and won Super Bowl XXI against the Denver Broncos.

In the playoffs, the Giants, who were the top seed in the conference ahead of the Bears, defeated the San Francisco 49ers for the second consecutive year in the playoffs by a score of 49–3. They then disposed of their division rivals, the Washington Redskins, in the NFC Championship Game 17–0. In the Super Bowl, behind Simms' 88% pass completion percentage and their strong defense, the Giants overcame a 10–9 halftime deficit and scored thirty second-half points while allowing only ten more and defeated the Broncos 39–20.

After making the playoffs in 1984 and 1985, the Giants entered the 1986 season as one of the favorites to win the Super Bowl. They began the season with a 31–28 loss to the Dallas Cowboys, before winning five consecutive games. After losing 17–12 to the Seattle Seahawks in week seven, the Giants won their final nine regular season games. Following the regular season, coach Bill Parcells won the NFL Coach of the Year Award, and eight Giants were named to the Pro Bowl. The Giants' defense, nicknamed the Big Blue Wrecking Crew, finished second in the league in points and yards allowed.

The 1986 Giants had been ranked as one of the greatest NFL teams of all time by fans, and members of the media. The Giants also ranked #12 on the 100 greatest teams of all time presented by the NFL on its 100th anniversary. It was this Giants team that popularized the practice of the "Gatorade shower", which entailed the players dousing members of the coaching staff with Gatorade near the end of a victorious game.

Off-season 
After two consecutive playoff seasons, the Giants entered the 1986 season as one of the favorites to win the Super Bowl.

Draft 

The Giants had five selections in the first two rounds of the 1986 NFL Draft, as opposed to the normal two, and 14 selections in the 12-round draft overall. Of the draft Giants' general manager George Young said, "This is not a blue-chip draft, but a strong blue-collar draft. A lot of people think there's better quantity than quality." With their first selection they chose defensive end Eric Dorsey #19 overall from the University of Notre Dame. With their four-second-round selections they chose Mark Collins, cornerback out of Cal State-Fullerton, Erik Howard, nose tackle out of Washington State University, Pepper Johnson, linebacker out of Ohio State University, and Greg Lasker, defensive back out of the University of Arkansas.

Personnel

Staff

Roster

Depth chart

Pre season

Schedule

Regular season

Schedule

Game Officials

Pre season

Regular season

Game summaries

Week 1: at Dallas Cowboys 

The Giants had their first test in the opening week Monday Night Football game against the defending Eastern Division champion Dallas Cowboys. Playing in front of 59,804 fans at Texas Stadium, the Giants lost the opener, 31–28. The teams played fairly evenly statistically; the Giants totalled 416 yards to the Cowboys' 392. Highlights of the game included Cowboys running back Herschel Walker, in his first NFL game, rushing 10 times for 64 yards and the game-winning touchdown, and fellow running back Tony Dorsett scoring on a 36-yard screen pass on the game's opening drive. The Giants struggled at the start of the game; they failed to get a first down on their first three drives, but their offense came alive and scored 28 points in the final three quarters.

Week 2: vs. San Diego Chargers 

 
In week two, the Giants defeated the San Diego Chargers 20–7 in front of 74,921 fans at Giants Stadium. The Giants led the Chargers 10–7 after three-quarters before scoring 10 in the fourth quarter to put the game out of reach. Joe Morris rushed 30 times for 83 yards and defensive backs Terry Kinard and Kenny Hill intercepted two passes each. Chargers quarterback Dan Fouts threw five-second half interceptions. "We took away their outside running game and their short passes", Giants' defensive coordinator Bill Belichick said. "When Fouts tried to go deep, that's when we got interceptions." The Giants dominated the Chargers in time of possession; 39 minutes 44 seconds to the Chargers' 20 minutes 16 seconds. The Giants defense forced eight turnovers overall, and held the Chargers to 41 rushing yards on 13 carries. After the game Fouts complimented the Giants defense, "There was no comparing the Giants' defense with the Dolphins' defense (the Chargers scored 50 points and totalled 500 yards against the Dolphins in week one). We never got anything established against the Giants. Momma said there would be days like this, and she was right."

Week 3: at Los Angeles Raiders 

The Giants played the Los Angeles Raiders in Los Angeles in week three. Joe Morris rushed for 110 yards on 18 carries—the first time in 19 games someone had rushed for 100 yards against the Raiders—and the Giants' defense held the Raiders to three field goals. Raiders running back Marcus Allen was held to 40 yards on 15 carries, ending his then-NFL record 11 game 100 yard rushing streak, and the Giants defeated the Raiders 14–9. The Raiders gained a total of 58 rushing yards, and committed nine penalties. Raiders' quarterback Jim Plunkett completed 21 of 41 passes for 281 yards, and Phil Simms threw touchdown passes of 18 and 11 yards to wide receiver Lionel Manuel.

Week 4: vs. New Orleans Saints 

The Giants rallied to beat the New Orleans Saints 20–17 in front of 72,769 fans at Giants Stadium in week four. They came back from a 17–0 second-quarter deficit, by scoring 20 points in the final three-quarters. Rueben Mayes of the Saints returned the second-half kickoff 99 yards for an apparent touchdown only to have the play called back because of an illegal block by linebacker Sam Mills. The decisive points came on Phil Simms's 4-yard touchdown pass to tight end Zeke Mowatt midway through the fourth quarter. The Giants dominated the Saints in time of possession, holding the ball for 38 minutes and 47 seconds to the Saints 21 minutes and 13 seconds.

Week 5: at St. Louis Cardinals 

The Giants faced the St. Louis Cardinals in St. Louis in their fifth game of the season. The Giants offense struggled, with Morris leading the team with a meager 53 rushing yards and quarterback Phil Simms completing only 8 of 20 passes for 104 yards. Mark Bavaro caught two passes and Bobby Johnson caught two as well, for 55 yards—the only passes caught by a Giants' wide receiver. The game was a defensive struggle that featured 17 punts, four field goals (two by each team), and one touchdown. The Giants won 13–6, and the decisive score was a 1-yard touchdown run by Joe Morris early in the third quarter. The Giants defense held the Cardinals to 2.4 yards per rush attempt and 3.8 yards per pass attempt in the victory.

Week 6: vs. Philadelphia Eagles 

 
In week six, the Giants hosted the Eagles at the Meadowlands. Linebacker Harry Carson scored his first career touchdown by catching a pass on a fake field goal in the third quarter, and the Giants defense sacked Eagles' quarterbacks Ron Jaworski and Randall Cunningham three times each. The Giants won 35–3; their largest margin of victory since they defeated the Seattle Seahawks, 32–0, in 1981. The Giants defense held the Eagles to 58 total yards, and Lawrence Taylor had four sacks and seven tackles. The sack total was Taylor's highest single game total since the 1984 season. The Giants dominated in time of possession; they held the ball for 39 minutes and 33 seconds to the Eagles 20 minutes and 27 seconds. Simms completed 20 of 29 passes for 214 yards and two touchdowns and ran for another touchdown.

Week 7: at Seattle Seahawks 

 
The Giants allowed six sacks in their week seven 17–12 loss to the Seattle Seahawks. Seahawks defensive end Jacob Green outplayed offensive tackle Karl Nelson and recorded a career-high four sacks. Phil Simms threw four interceptions but coach Bill Parcells denied he was struggling, "[y]ou'd like not to take a sack in the scoring zone, but sometimes it's hard to know when to throw it away. Two of Phil's interceptions were rebounds that had nothing to do with the quarterback. On the interception on fourth and 14 at the end, he was trying to make a play. I think I would have thrown there, too. The other interception was his mistake. I don't think he's in a slump."

Week 8: vs. Washington Redskins 

The Giants improved to 6-2 and moved into a tie with Washington for the division lead after defeating them on the same night the New York Mets won the 1986 World Series at Shea Stadium. Fans attending the football game brought portable televisions and spent much of the time reacting to the baseball game, leading to a Redskins false start in one instance. With the teams tied 20–20, Joe Morris scored the game-winning touchdown on a 13-yard run with 98 seconds remaining. The Giants offense featured a two tight end formation throughout much of the game which allowed them to run the ball more effectively. The Giants used Mark Bavaro and Zeke Mowatt throughout much of the game, sometimes even lining them up on the same side. Morris finished the game with 181 yards. Redskins quarterback Jay Schroeder threw for 420 yards in the loss.

Week 9: vs. Dallas Cowboys 

The Giants played the Cowboys at Giants Stadium in week nine. Defensive end George Martin recorded a late sack, termed by head coach Bill Parcells as the biggest play of the game, to help the Giants to a 17–14 victory. The Giants held running backs Tony Dorsett to 45 yards in 10 carries and Herschel Walker to 34 yards in 10 carries. The Cowboys outgained the Giants 408 to 245 in total yardage, and had 25 first downs compared with the Giants' 14. Phil Simms struggled and completed only 6 of 18 passes for 67 yards, but Joe Morris rushed 29 times for 181 yards and two touchdowns as the Giants improved to 7–2.

Week 10: at Philadelphia Eagles 

In week 10, the Giants then travelled to Philadelphia to play the Eagles. In a physical game marked by several scuffles, the Giants passing game struggled as several receivers played with injuries, and quarterback Phil Simms completed only one pass to a wide receiver; a 17-yarder to Solomon Miller. Coach Bill Parcells placed the blame for the passing game's performance on dropped passes by the receivers. "You can't throw the ball much better than Phil did yesterday", commented Parcells. "But he didn't have the numbers to show for it." The Eagles rushed for 153 yards and outgained the Giants 265 to 237 in total yards. The Giants won 17–14 nonetheless despite Simms completing only 14 of 36 passes overall. The Giants rode their running attack as Joe Morris passed the 100 yard mark for the fourth consecutive game; Morris totalled 116, 181, 181 and 111 yards in that period. Lawrence Taylor recorded three sacks of the Giants defense seven sacks in the victory.

Week 11: at Minnesota Vikings 

Trailing the Minnesota Vikings 20–19 with 72 seconds left in the fourth quarter at the Metrodome in week 11, Phil Simms completed a desperate 22-yard pass on fourth and 17 to Bobby Johnson for a first down. The completion led to Raúl Allegre's fifth field goal and an important Giants victory 22–20. In the Giants' three previous games, Simms had completed only six passes to wide receivers. In the Giants' victory he completed eight to wide receivers, four to tight end Mark Bavaro and 13 to his running backs—four to Ottis Anderson in the final two drives, three to Maurice Carthon, three to Joe Morris and three to Tony Galbreath. Simms commented years later, "[i]t's my favorite game in my career, because it's everything I always wanted to be as a player. I wanted to be tough, making big throws, immune to pressure, not worried about outcomes. It was truly like standing on the tee box in golf and there's trees on each side and water and you just go 'Man, I'm gonna rip it down the middle.' And no other thought crosses your mind." The game has frequently been credited as a signature game of their season, and the Giants players celebrated the victory in the tunnel leading to their locker room and in the locker room itself in a raucous manner that was highly atypical for the team. "They high-fived themselves silly", recalled Peter King. "They were screaming and hooting and raising hell—happier than they had been all year."

Week 12: vs. Denver Broncos 

In week 12, in what would turn out to be a preview of Super Bowl XXI, veteran defensive end George Martin (at 34 the oldest player on the team) intercepted a pass from Denver Broncos quarterback John Elway and returned it 78 yards for a touchdown before being tackled from behind in the end zone by a celebrating Lawrence Taylor. Then in the final two minutes of the game, Simms hit fan–favorite Phil McConkey for a 46-yard pass. This led to another game-winning kick from Allegre as the Giants defeated Denver 19–16 in front of 75,116 fans at Giants Stadium. With the victory the Giants completed their second five-game winning streak of the season, several of them in close contests; the margin of victory in those five games was 7, 3, 3, 2, and 3 points.

Week 13: at San Francisco 49ers 

In a Monday night encounter at San Francisco in week 13, the Giants overcame a 17–0 halftime deficit to Joe Montana's 49ers en route to a 21–17 victory. In the win, Simms threw for nearly 400 yards and wide receiver Stacy Robinson made an acrobatic catch at the goalline to set up the winning touchdown. Another important play also occurred during that Monday Night Football game. Here is a description of the play taken from a Monday Night Football broadcast in 2005: "On Dec. 1 1986, New York Giants tight end Mark Bavaro cements his reputation as one of the toughest men in the NFL. With the Giants trailing, Bavaro catches an innocent pass from Phil Simms over the middle. It takes nearly seven 49ers defenders to finally drag him down, some of which are carried for almost 20 yards, including future Hall of Famer Ronnie Lott. Bavaro's inspiring play jump starts the Giants, who win the game and eventually the Super Bowl."

Week 14: at Washington Redskins 

The Giants defeated the Redskins 24–14 in week 14 to move into sole possession of first place in the NFC East. The Redskins held Joe Morris, who had rushed for 181 yards in the Giants week eight victory, to 62 yards on 22 carries. However, Lawrence Taylor recorded three sacks and harassed Redskins' quarterback Jay Schroeder all game, as the Giants recorded four sacks and the Redskins only recorded one. Phil Simms threw touchdown passes to Mark Bavaro, Bobby Johnson, and Phil McConkey in the victory. Schroeder threw six interceptions in the game, matching Sammy Baugh's franchise record, and the Redskins had 7 turnovers overall. After the game, Parcells gave the Redskins credit for their performance and told the reporters that he had a feeling that the two would meet again sometime in the playoffs.

Week 15: vs. St. Louis Cardinals 

The Giants defeated the St. Louis Cardinals 27–7 in their fifteenth game of the season in front of 75,261 fans at Giants Stadium. Joe Morris ran for 179 yards and three touchdowns, but had three fumbles. Phil Simms struggled, but the offense was effective nonetheless; of the Giants 313 total yards, 252 came on the ground, while only 62 came from the passing game. The Giants defense controlled the Cardinals throughout the game, particularly in the first half; the Cardinals' first four possessions ended in third-down sacks and fourth-down punts. The Giants committed only two penalties for a total of ten yards, and their defense set a franchise record with nine sacks, despite sending Lawrence Taylor into pass coverage for most of the game. With the victory the Giants clinched their first NFC East division crown.

Week 16: vs. Green Bay Packers 

The Giants headed into their final regular season game against the Green Bay Packers as 11½-point favorites and needed a victory to secure homefield advantage throughout the playoffs. Sparked by a blocked punt returned for a TD by Tom Flynn, who had recently been picked up from the Packers, the Giants defeated the Packers 55–24 in front of 71,351 fans at Giants Stadium to finish the regular season with a franchise record 14 victories. The win was the Giants' ninth consecutive, matching the team record set in 1962. The Giants also set a franchise record for points in the first quarter of a game with 21. Although the Packers cut the score to 24–17 at halftime, the Giants scored 31-second half points to put the game out of reach.

Standings

Playoffs

Schedule

Post season Game Officials

NFC Divisional Playoffs: vs. San Francisco 49ers 

The Giants defeated the San Francisco 49ers 49–3 in their opening playoff game. Favored by only three points, the Giants caught a break when 49ers WR Jerry Rice fumbled an apparent touchdown catch-and-carry off his knee early in the game, then dominated the Niners the rest of the way. Their defense held the 49ers to 29 yards rushing, 184 yards in total offense, and 2 of 14 on third-down conversions. The Giants did not commit a turnover and totalled 216 rushing yards. Jim Burt knocked 49ers quarterback Joe Montana out of the game in the second quarter, hitting him as he threw a pass which Lawrence Taylor intercepted and returned the pick 34 yards for a touchdown. The Giants defense also held the 49ers to only nine first downs, and 15 of 37 passing for zero touchdowns and three interceptions.

NFC Championship: vs. Washington Redskins 

With wind gusts reaching , coach Bill Parcells chose to take the wind when his team won the opening coin toss of the Giants' NFC Championship Game against the Washington Redskins. With the wind at their backs the Giants scored 10 first quarter points while the Redskins managed only two first downs. The Redskins were forced to punt three times in the quarter, and the wind limited those punts to 23, 27, and 24 yards. The Redskins launched a drive behind Jay Schroeder's 48-yard completion to wide receiver Art Monk in the second quarter. However, after the Redskins botched the field goal snap on a 51-yard field goal attempt, the Giants drove for a touchdown with the wind in their face to make the score 17–0 at halftime. The Giants defense dominated the second half, and both teams went scoreless to make the final score 17–0. Schroeder completed only 20 of 50 passes for a meager 3.8 yards per attempt. Keys to the victory were tackle Brad Benson's neutralizing of Redskins pass rusher Dexter Manley, who had 18.5 sacks on the season, and the team's defense. After the game, John Madden remarked: "Last year, I thought the Bears had the best defense I had ever seen. But in the last two weeks, I feel these Giants have as good a defense as has ever played in this league."

Super Bowl XXI: vs. Denver Broncos 

The Giants played the Denver Broncos in Super Bowl XXI in front of 101,063 fans at the Rose Bowl. After the Broncos' Rich Karlis kicked a 48-yard field goal on the game's opening drive, the Giants took the lead with a 78-yard touchdown scoring drive, led by quarterback Phil Simms's 6-for-6 passing. The Broncos scored on a 4-yard quarterback draw by John Elway to make the score 10–7 at the end of the first quarter. Although the two teams' quarterbacks combined to complete all 13 passes attempted in the second quarter, the only score came when Giants' defensive end George Martin sacked Elway in the endzone for a safety to make the score 10–9.

A turning point of the game came on the first possession of the second half. The Giants received the second half kickoff, and led a short drive that stalled at their own 47-yard line. On fourth and 1, the Giants lined up in a punt formation before shifting to a traditional set. Second string quarterback Jeff Rutledge then looked over to Parcells for a signal as to whether he should try to draw the defense offside or run a play. After a nod of approval from Parcells, he ran a quarterback sneak for a first down. The Giants scored on the drive, and built a 39–13 lead before a late touchdown by the Broncos made the final score 39–20. Simms threw touchdown passes to Mark Bavaro and Phil McConkey to give him three on the game, and Joe Morris and Ottis Anderson each rushed for one touchdown. The Giants' defense limited the Broncos to only two net yards and 10 offensive plays in the third quarter. The 30-second half points set a Super Bowl-record for points in a half, and Simms was named MVP after completing 22 of 25 (88%) of his passes—a Super Bowl record which still stands.

Postseason honors 
Following the season eight Giants—tight end Mark Bavaro, offensive lineman Brad Benson, nose tackle Jim Burt, linebackers Lawrence Taylor and Harry Carson, punter Sean Landeta, running back Morris, and defensive end Leonard Marshall—were selected to the Pro Bowl. Taylor, who recorded a league-leading 20.5 sacks, became one of just two defensive players to win the NFL Most Valuable Player award and the only defensive player to win the award unanimously. Taylor also won his record third Defensive Player of the Year Award and coach Bill Parcells won his first NFL Coach of the Year Award.

Stats 

Passing

Rushing

Receiving

Kicking

Punting

Kick Return

Punt Return

Defense & Fumbles

Scoring Summary

Team

Quarter-by-quarter

Gatorade shower 

It was these 1986 Giants that popularized the football tradition of dousing the head coach with a cooler of Gatorade near the end of a victorious game. This originated in 1984 when Jim Burt, incensed by what he thought was mistreatment he received during practice, exacted revenge on Bill Parcells by dumping a cooler of Gatorade on him. Lawrence Taylor and Harry Carson later picked up on the ploy and would often sneak up on Coach Parcells near the end of games to dump the remaining Gatorade over his head. The dousing was a big hit with fans, and the Gatorade dumping continued throughout the season after each win, with Taylor, Carson, and several other players (Burt had since ceased doing it) concocting increasingly elaborate, sneaky, and playful ruses, so as to at least attempt to keep the inevitable dousing a surprise.

Historical ranking 
The 1986 New York Giants are considered one of the greatest NFL teams of all time, being recognized by the NFL Films series America's Game as the 13th greatest Super Bowl Champion, as well as being selected as the eighth greatest NFL team of all time by readers in a "Page 2" article on ESPN.com. In 2010, the team was tied for fifth in ESPN.com's NFL Super League, a project that ranked the 16 greatest NFL Super Bowl winning teams using computer simulations of a season of play between these teams, and were ranked eighth in The Ultimate Super Rankings, a 2007 ESPN ranking of the top 80 Super Bowl era NFL teams.

Season facts 
 The Giants beat the Redskins three times in one season twice in the regular season and once in the playoffs. This was the third time that a team won three games in season against the same opponent. (1982 Dolphins-Jets and 1983 Seahawks-Raiders)
 During the season, the Giants honored the memories of two of their former players on their uniforms. A helmet sticker with the number 38 was added to the uniforms after John Tuggle, a former running back the Giants selected as the final pick of the 1983 draft, died of angiosarcoma in August 1986. After former defensive back and two-time Pro Bowler Spider Lockhart died of lymphoma in July 1986, a patch with Lockhart's nickname and number were added to the jerseys and the Giants wore both the sticker and the jersey patch the whole season.

Awards and honors 
 Bill Parcells, National Football League Coach of the Year Award
 Phil Simms, Super Bowl Most Valuable Player
 Lawrence Taylor, AP NFL MVP
 Lawrence Taylor, PFWA NFL MVP
 Lawrence Taylor, Bert Bell Award
 Lawrence Taylor, AP NFL Defensive Player of the Year
 Lawrence Taylor, NEA NFL Defensive Player of the Year
 Lawrence Taylor, UPI NFC Defensive Player of the Year
 Lawrence Taylor, NFC Defensive Player of the Year

See also 
 History of the New York Giants (1979–93)
 List of New York Giants seasons

References

Sources 

 Neft, David S., Cohen, Richard M., and Korch, Rick. The Complete History of Professional Football from 1892 to the Present. New York: St. Martin's Press. 1994 
 Pervin, Lawrence A. Football's New York Giants: A History. McFarland 2009 
 Pooley, Eric. True Blue, New York, New York Media LLC, January 26, 1987, issue ISSN 0028-7369 (available online)
 Schwartz, John. Tales from the New York Giants Sideline, Sports Publishing LLC, 2004 
 Sprechman, Jordan and Shannon, Bill. This Day in New York Sports, Illinois: Sports Publishing LLC. 1998

External links 
 New York Giants official website—history section
 1986 New York Giants season stats and box scores at databasefootball.com
 1986 New York Giants season at Pro Football Reference

New York Giants seasons
New York Giants
NFC East championship seasons
National Football Conference championship seasons
Super Bowl champion seasons
New York Giants season
20th century in East Rutherford, New Jersey
Meadowlands Sports Complex